Chawpi Urqu (Quechua chawpi middle, center, urqu mountain, "middle mountain", also spelled Chaupi Orjo) is a mountain in the Andes of Peru which reaches a height of approximately  . It is located in the Huancavelica Region, Churcampa Province, Chinchihuasi District.

References

Mountains of Peru
Mountains of Huancavelica Region